Girls are young female humans.

Girls or The Girls may also refer to:

Film and television 
 Les Girls, a 1957 musical directed by George Cukor
 The Girls (1961 film), a USSR comedy directed by Yuri Chulyukin
 The Girls (1968 film), a Swedish drama directed by Mai Zetterling
 The Girls (2007 film), a British short starring Duncan Duff
 Girls (1980 film), a French-West German-Canadian drama film directed by Just Jaeckin
 Girls (1919 film)
 Girls (2007 film), an Egyptian drama film also known as Balad El Banat
 Girls (2014 film), a Chinese film directed by Wong Chun-chun
 "Girls" (Serial Experiments Lain episode)
 Girls (TV series), a 2012–2017 HBO series
 Girl (2018 film), a Belgian film directed by Lukas Dhont
 "Girls", an episode of Heartstopper

Literature 
 Girls (comics)
 The Girls (Lansens novel), 2005 novel by Lori Lansens
 "Girls" (short story), a short story by Mrinal Pande
 The Girls, a 1921 novel by Edna Ferber
 The Girls (Cline novel), 2016 novel by Emma Cline
 Girls, an Indonesian children magazine published from 2005 to 2016

Music

Performers 
 The Girls (1960s band), an American pop group
 Girls (band), an American indie rock band from San Francisco

Albums and songs 

 Girls (Aespa EP)

 Girls (Eric Stewart album)
 Girls (Exo-CBX EP)
 Girls (Yung Baby Tate album)
 "Girls" (Beastie Boys song)
 "Girls" (Beenie Man song)
 "Girls" (Kid Cudi song)
 "Girls" (The Prodigy song)
 "Girls" (Rita Ora song)
 "Girls" (Sugababes song)
 "Girls" (The 1975 song)
 "Girls" (Tina Turner song), co-written by David Bowie and later recorded by him
 "The Girls" (song), by Calvin Harris
 "Run the World (Girls)", by Beyoncé Knowles
 "Girls", a song by D12 from the album Devil's Night
 "Girls", a song by Death in Vegas from the album Scorpio Rising
 "Girls", a song by Diana Ross from the album Ross
 "Girls", a song by Dwight Twilley
 "Girls", a song by Fabolous from the album Real Talk
 "Girls", a song by Fake Shark – Real Zombie! from the album Liar
 "Girls", a song by Girl in Red
 "Girls", a song by Marina and the Diamonds from the album The Family Jewels
 "Girls", a song by Miranda Lambert from the album Platinum
 "Girls", a song by N-Dubz from the album Love.Live.Life
 "Girls", a song by Nizlopi from the album Half These Songs Are About You
 "Girls", a song by Queen City Kids
 "Girls", a song by Seven
 "Girls", a song by The Dare
 "Girls (Part 1)", a song by The Moments and The Whatnauts
 "Girls", a song by The Sugarhill Gang from the album Livin' in the Fast Lane
 "Girls", a song by twlv from the album K.I.S.S
 "Girls", B-side of the single "Catch Me If You Can" by Girls' Generation
 "Girls...", a song by Marshall Crenshaw from his self-titled debut album
 "Girl", a song by Chris Spedding from the album Enemy Within

Other uses 
 Girls, Inc., a non-profit education and advocacy group
 Girls, a 1910 play by Clyde Fitch

See also 
 Girl (disambiguation)
 Girls Girls Girls (disambiguation)